Lucas Arnold Ker and Jaime Oncins win the title by defeating Marc-Kevin Goellner and Eric Taino 6–4, 7–6(7–1) in the final.

Seeds

Draw

Draw

References
 Official Results Archive (ATP)
 Official Results Archive (ITF)

Doubles